Wan Abu Yazid Bustami bin Wan Mokhter (born 27 June 1989) is a Malaysian professional footballer. He last played for Perak FA in the Malaysian Super League. He is left-sided midfielder.

Wan Abu Yazid is a product of the Perak FA youth system. He is a regular for the FAM President's Cup team and was part of their championship-winning batch of 2007. He made his first ever appearance for Perak in a 5-0 demolition of Sarawak FA on 1 January 2008. He played the full 90 minutes of that match.

Wan Abu Yazid made his second appearance as a substitute against Pahang FA on 19 January 2008. He scored his first senior goal on 26 January in a match against PDRM FC which ended 6-0.

Wan Abu Yazid were not retained in Perak squad for the 2009 season.

References 

1989 births
Living people
Malaysian footballers
Perak F.C. players
Malaysian people of Malay descent
Association football midfielders